Henry Peterson may refer to:
 Henry Peterson (author) (1818–1891), American writer and editor
 Henry K. Peterson (1884–1966), justice of the Iowa Supreme Court
 Ole Pete (Henry Peterson, c. 1854–1934), American folk legend

See also
 Harry H. Peterson (1890–1985), American lawyer, judge and politician
 Henry Petersen (1900–1949), Danish athlete
 Henry E. Petersen (1921–1991), American attorney and government official
 Henry Pettersson (1919–2016), Swedish sprint canoer